Video Ranger 007 is a South Korean animated theatrical film based on the Japanese anime television series Video Warrior Laserion produced in 1984 by Daewon Media.

Production
Most of the drawings were pirated from the Japanese animation sequences from works such as Video Warrior Laserion that Daewon Media was outsourcing for Japanese animation studio Toei doga.

Arrest
The director for the film was arrested for breach of copyright.

Characters
 Kang-To / Takashi Katori in Video Warrior Laserion
 Erena / Olivia Lawrence in Video Warrior Laserion

References

External links
 

1984 films
South Korean animated films